En Patufet was an illustrated children's magazine, written in Catalan, published in Barcelona (Spain), between 1904 and 1938. Later, between 1968 and 1973, it was resumed under the name Patufet. It had a great popularity, to the point that the word patufet was used generically to refer to the illustrated magazines for children, now called comics. It was the Catalan weekly magazine with the most circulation (65,000) and readers weekly (325,000).

The figure of Patufet on the magazine was first drawn by Antonio Montañola.

Writers and Illustrators
Some of the writers and illustrators that worked with En Patufet:

Lola Anglada
José María Folch Torres
Juan Villa Pujol, D'Ivori
Manuel Marinelo
Cayetano Cornet Palau
Juan Llaverías Labró
Juan García Junceda
Javier Bonfill Trías, Jorge Catalán
Antonio Batllori Jofré
Josefina Tanganelli, Abel
Ricardo Opisso
Carlos Bécquer Domínguez
José Broquetas Ríos
Luis Almerich Sellarés, Clovis Eimeric

See also
 ¡Cu-Cut!

References

External links
 Digitization is available through the portal ARCA (Arxiu de Revistes Catalanes Antigues= Old Catalan Serials Archive)
 Fundació Folch i Torres
Francesc Mestre: Ilustradores Ilustres

1904 establishments in Spain
1938 disestablishments in Spain
1968 establishments in Spain
1973 disestablishments in Spain
Catalan-language magazines
Magazines published in Catalonia
Children's magazines published in Spain
Comics magazines published in Spain
1904 comics debuts
1938 comics endings
1968 comics debuts
1973 comics endings
Defunct magazines published in Spain
Magazines established in 1904
Magazines disestablished in 1938
Magazines established in 1968
Magazines disestablished in 1973
Magazines published in Barcelona
Weekly magazines published in Spain